Gary John Shortland (born 4 March 1976 in Frimley Green, Surrey, England) is a professional ice skating coach, owner and founder of Apta Fitted. As an eligible skater, he competed with partner Charlotte Clements at the World Figure Skating Championships, the European Figure Skating Championships, and many other international events. They were Four-time(1993),(1995), (1997 & 1998) British national champions European, and world competitors. Gary currently resides in Charlotte, North Carolina and specializes in coaching Ice Dance, Choreography, Power and Edge.

References

1976 births
Living people
English male ice dancers